Ruurd Dirk Hoogland (1922 Leeuwarden - 18 November 1994 Paris) was a Dutch-born explorer and naturalist, who migrated to Australia and made numerous botanical expeditions to New Guinea, Oceania and Europe. He was an expert on the family Cunoniaceae.

He received his university education in Groningen and Leiden. He earned his doctorate in 1952 with a review of the genus Dillenia under Professor van Steenis and in that year he joined the Australian CSIRO in the Division of Land Research in Canberra as a botanist initially focusing on the then Australian "dependency" of Papua New Guinea. Subsequently, his field work included expeditions to remote Australian territories such as Lord Howe and Norfolk Islands, and to other Commonwealth countries including Sri Lanka and Malaysia. He transferred from CSIRO to the Research School of Biological Sciences at the Australian National University, but was forced to "retire" after contracting Myasthenia gravis. Despite this, he continued to work wherever he could find appropriate facilities, and was fortunate to obtain a visiting fellowship at the Laboratoire de Phanérogamie within the Muséum Nationale d'Histoire Naturelle in Paris before he turned 65, where he continued to work until shortly before his death. His last field trip was to New Caledonia about 6 months before his passing. Throughout his career, he made regular visits and contributed specimens to collaborating herbaria or botanic gardens around the world including Sydney (over 740 specimens), Leiden and Kew Gardens, amongst many others.

Plants named after author 
 Genera
 (Cunoniaceae) Hooglandia McPherson & Lowry

Species
 (Araceae) Homalomena hooglandii A.Hay
 (Asteraceae) Olearia hooglandii J.Kost.
 (Asteraceae) Senecio hooglandii Belcher
 (Cunoniaceae) Weinmannia hooglandii H.C.Hopkins & J.C.Bradford
 (Cyatheaceae) Alsophila hooglandii (Holttum) R.M.Tryon
 (Dilleniaceae) Hibbertia hooglandii J.R.Wheeler
 (Ericaceae) Vaccinium hooglandii Sleumer
 (Gleicheniaceae) Gleichenia hooglandii Holttum
 (Leguminosae) Archidendron hooglandii Verdc.
 (Leguminosae) Serianthes hooglandii (Fosb.) A.Kanis
 (Melastomataceae) Poikilogyne hooglandii Nayar
 (Monimiaceae) Palmeria hooglandii Philipson
 (Myristicaceae) Myristica hooglandii J.Sinclair
 (Onagraceae) Epilobium hooglandii P.H.Raven
 (Pandanaceae) Pandanus hooglandii H.St.John
 (Piperaceae) Piper hooglandii (I.Hutton & P.S.Green) M.A.Jaram.
 (Rosaceae) Potentilla hooglandii Kalkman
 (Rutaceae) Evodiella hooglandii B.L.Linden

References 

1922 births
1994 deaths
20th-century Dutch botanists
Dutch explorers
20th-century Dutch explorers
Botanists with author abbreviations
Explorers of New Guinea
Leiden University alumni
People from Leeuwarden
University of Groningen alumni
Dutch emigrants to Australia